Ray Horwood (1 December 1927 – 15 October 2009) was an Australian rules footballer who played with Collingwood and Richmond in the Victorian Football League (VFL).

In early 1953, Horwood trained with the Richmond Football Club. He later went back to Collingwood in 1953  and managed to play two senior games in 1954. 		

Horwood purchased a sport store in Sanger St, Corowa and played with Corowa Football Club in 1955 in the Ovens and Murray Football League.

Notes

External links 
		
Profile on Collingwood Forever

1927 births
2009 deaths
Australian rules footballers from Victoria (Australia)
Collingwood Football Club players
Richmond Football Club players